Jan Czekanowski (October 8, 1882, Głuchów – July 20, 1965, Szczecin) was a Polish anthropologist, statistician, ethnographer, traveller, and linguist. His scientific contributions include introducing his system of racial classification and founding the field of computational linguistics.

Czekanowski is known for having played an important role in saving the Polish-Lithuanian branch of the Karaite people from Holocaust extermination. In 1942, he managed to convince German "race scientists" that the Karaites were of Turkic origin although professing Judaism and using Hebrew as a liturgical language. This helped the Karaites escape the tragic destiny of other European Jews and the Romas.

Life
Czekanowski attended school in Warsaw but was transferred to Latvia, where he finished his education in 1901. He then entered a university in Zurich in 1902; there, he studied anthropology, mathematics, anatomy, and ethnography as a pupil of Swiss anthropologist Rudolf Martin, author of the popular anthropology textbook Lehrbuch der Anthropologie. In 1907 Czekanowski defended his doctoral dissertation. For his dissertation research he traveled to the Royal Museum in Berlin and to Middle Africa from 1906 to 1907. While in Africa, he led a team into the Congo to collect ethnographic materials. While working on studying the societies of Africa, he developed various statistical methods and contributed to the field of taxonomy. The research he made in Africa has since been published in five volumes and sent in 1910, to Saint Petersburg ethnography.

He then became a professor at the University of Lviv and University of Poznań. While working he introduced an innovative approach to mathematical statistics. He worked in these universities from 1913 to 1945 and in the period 1923-1924 he was a president of Polish Copernicus Society of Naturalists. In addition, he worked at the University of Poznań from 1937-1946, where he researched the dynamics of evolution in human populations. He played numerous scientific roles at the University of Poznań, including vice-chairman of the Polish Social Statistic Company.

Racial classification
Czekanowski classified Europe into four pure races. The four pure races were the Nordic, Mediterranean (Ibero-Insular), Lapponoid and Armenoid. The Lapponoid included the central and eastern Europeans along Europe longitudely as well as the Sami people of Northern Europe.

Czekanowski classified six subraces in Europe which were mixed types of the pure races.   The six mixed racial subraces were: the Northwestern (Nordic and Mediterranean), the Subnordic (Nordic and Lapponoid), Alpine (Nordic and Armenoid), the Littoral (Mediterranean and Armenoid), Sublapponoid (Mediterranean and Lapponoid) and the Dinaric (Lapponoid and Armenoid). The Sublapponoid subrace (also called Pile Dwelling race) lived around the Swiss lakes.
The Greek letters which symbolise races and types could be capital or lower case.

Linguistics
Czekanowski introduced numerical taxonomy into comparative linguistics, thus founding the discipline of computational linguistics. He developed (1913) a still much-used index of similarity between two samples. He applied it to phonemes and words in text corpora of different languages. It was later introduced in analysis of ecological communities.

Books
 Forschungen im Nil-Kongo. Zwischengebiet (1911–17)
 Zarys metod statystycznych w zastosowaniu do antropologii [An outline of statistical methods applied in anthropology]. Warszawa: Towarzystwo Naukowe Warszawskie (1913)
 Zarys antropologii Polski (1930)
 Człowiek w czasie i przestrzeni (1934)
 Polska - Słowiańszczyzna. Perspektywy antropologiczne (1948)
 Wstęp do historii Słowian, Poznań 1957
 Człowiek w czasie i przestrzeni (third edition) (1967)

See also
List of Poles

External links 

 Czekanowski's Diagram: a Method of Multidimensional Clustering

References

1882 births
1965 deaths
Burials at Powązki Cemetery
Polish anthropologists
Linguists from Poland
Polish statisticians
Members of the Lwów Scientific Society
20th-century anthropologists
20th-century linguists